Massack is an unincorporated community in Plumas County, California. It lies at an elevation of 3642 feet (1110 m). California State Route 89 runs through Massack.

The Massack post office operated from 1917 to 1939, moving in 1937.

References

Unincorporated communities in California
Unincorporated communities in Plumas County, California